Hediana Julimarbela (born 5 March 1999) is an Indonesian badminton player affiliated with Exist Jakarta club.

Career 
In 2018, Julimarbela lost in the semi-finals of the Hyderabad Open partnering with Renaldi Samosir.

In 2019, Julimarbela won the mixed doubles title at the Indonesia International partnering with Zachariah Josiahno Sumanti.

In 2021, Julimarbela and Sumanti lost in the semi-finals of the Orléans Masters. 

In 2022, Julimarbela and Sumanti won their second title in the 2022 Italian International. They made their debut in the BWF World Championships, but lost in the second round from 15th seeds Robin Tabeling and Selena Piek from the Netherlands. In September, they lost in semifinal of 2022 Vietnam Open from fellow Indonesian pair Dejan Ferdinansyah and Gloria Emanuelle Widjaja. In October, they lost in first round of 2022 Denmark Open from the to top seeds Dechapol Puavaranukroh and Sapsiree Taerattanachai.

2023 
In January, Julimarbela and Sumanti started their season by losing in the first round of the Malaysia Open from the 2021 All England Open runner-up Yuki Kaneko and Misaki Matsutomo of Japan. In the following week, they lost again in the first round of the India Open from Danish pair Mathias Christiansen and Alexandra Bøje. They competed at the home tournament, Indonesia Masters, but had to lose in the first round from English pair Gregory Mairs and Jenny Moore. In the next tournament, they lost in the quarter-finals of the Thailand Masters from Korean pair Kim Won-ho and Jeong Na-eun.

Achievements

BWF International Challenge/Series (2 titles) 
Mixed doubles

  BWF International Challenge tournament
  BWF International Series tournament
  BWF Future Series tournament

Performance timeline

Individual competitions

Junior level

Senior level

Women's doubles

Mixed doubles

References

External links 
 

1999 births
Living people
People from the Riau Islands
Indonesian female badminton players
20th-century Indonesian women
21st-century Indonesian women